Goggomobil was a series of microcars produced by Hans Glas GmbH in the Bavarian town Dingolfing between 1955 and 1969.

Glas produced three models on the Goggomobil platform: the Goggomobil T sedan, the Goggomobil TS coupé, and the Goggomobil TL van. The engine was an air-cooled, two-stroke, two-cylinder unit originally displacing 250 cc, but later available in increased sizes of 300 cc and 400 cc.  It had an electric pre-selective transmission built by Getrag and a manual clutch.  The engine was behind the rear wheels. Suspension was independent all round using coil springs with swing axles.

214,313 sedans, 66,511 coupés, and 3,667 Transporter vans and pickups were built from 1955 to 1969.

T sedan

The Goggomobil T250 was introduced by Glas at the 1954 IFMA international bicycle and motorcycle show. The T250 was a conventional-looking two door sedan with a rear-mounted 245 cc air-cooled two-stroke straight twin engine.

Design changes were made to the T250 in 1957.  Two windshield wipers were used instead of the earlier single wiper, and the sliding windows in the doors were changed to wind-up windows.  Also, at this time the T300 and T400 became available; these had larger engines of 300 cc and 400 cc capacity respectively.

The last design change for the T sedan came in 1964, when the rear-hinged suicide doors were replaced by conventional front-hinged doors.

214,313 sedans were built before production ended on 30 June 1969.

TS coupe

The Goggomobil TS 2+2 coupe was introduced at the 1957 IFMA show alongside the improved T sedan. It was available as the TS250, the TS300, and the TS400, the number reflecting the approximate engine size in cubic centimeters.

The only major design change to the TS coupe was the change from rear-hinged suicide doors to front-hinged conventional doors in 1964.

The TS coupe was always ten to twenty percent more expensive than the T sedan.  Total production of TS coupes was 66,511.

TS 300 specifications and performance
The specifications of a 1957 Goggomobil TS 300 Coupe are:
 Configuration — Glas 2-stroke rear engine, 298 cc displacement
 Engine — 2-cylinder, 2 stroke, air-cooled, 58 x 56 mm. bore and stroke, 6.0:1 compression,  at 5,000 rpm,  torque.
 Transmission — 4 speed plus reverse (with electric pre-selector as an available option).
 Top Speed — 
 Tires — 4.80 x 10 inch.
 Weight — .
 Wheelbase —  
 Height -  
 Length -  
 Width -  

The test car cost £625 including taxes of £209 on the UK market.

TS 250 specifications
The specifications of a 1958 Goggomobil TS 250 Coupe are: 
 Configuration — Glas 2-stroke rear engine, 247 cc displacement
 Engine — 2-cylinder, 2 stroke, air-cooled,  at 5,000 rpm
 Transmission — 4 speed plus reverse
 Top Speed — 
 Tires — 4.40 x 10 inch
 Weight —

Goggomobil Transporter TL van

The Goggomobil Transporter, or Goggomobil TL, was introduced at the 1956 IFMA show. The Transporter was built largely at the request of the German Federal Postal Service, which procured more than 2,000 Transporters between October 1957 and November 1965.

The Transporter had sliding front doors. It was available as an enclosed van with double back doors or as a pickup with a tailgate to the open bed. Transporter pickups were often used by municipal services as snowplows or street sweepers.

3,667 Transporter vans and pickups were produced.

US export editions
Goggomobils were exported to the United States. These were special export versions, with the 400 cc engine, an automatic gasoline-oil mixer, and  sealed-beam headlights as required by US regulations.

Goggomobil Dart

Between 1957 and 1961 some 700 sports cars called Goggomobil Darts were produced by Buckle Motors Pty Ltd in Sydney, Australia. Other Goggomobil models were also produced under licence, including saloon, coupe, coupe-convertible and light van variants. These were fitted with Australian-produced fibreglass bodies in place of the steel bodies of their German counterparts. Australian production totalled approximately 5,000 units. In 2019 an Australian documentary featuring the Dart was released, called "D'art" by Karl von Möller.

References 

Taschen, Benedikt. Kleinwagen, Small Cars, Petites Voitures, 1994.

External links 

 
 http://www.californiaclassix.com/archive/59_Goggo.html
 http://www.microcarmuseum.com/tour/goggo-t250sunroof.html

Microcars
Defunct motor vehicle manufacturers of Germany
Goggomobil
Cars introduced in 1955
1955 establishments in Germany
1969 disestablishments in Germany
Rear-engined cars